Bill Inlet is a small inlet lying immediately east of Undine Harbor, near the west end of South Georgia. The name appears to be first used on a 1929 British Admiralty chart.

References
 

Bodies of water of South Georgia and the South Sandwich Islands
Inlets of subantarctic islands